Grevillea evansiana, commonly known as Evans grevillea, is a species of flowering plant in the family Proteaceae and is endemic to a restricted area of New South Wales. It is a low, dense, spreading shrub with elliptic leaves and usually blackish-red flowers with a burgundy-coloured style.

Description

Taxonomy
Grevillea evansiana was first formally described in 1953 by Hugh Shaw MacKee in Proceedings of the Linnean Society of New South Wales from specimens he collected near the Cudgegong River in the Rylstone area in 1951. The specific epithet (evansiana) honours Obed David Evans.

Distribution and habitat
Evans grevillea usually grows in forest or woodland, sometimes in swampy heath and is only known from east of Rylstone in New South Wales.

Conservation status
Grevillea evansiana is listed as "vulnerable" under the Australian Government Environment Protection and Biodiversity Conservation Act 1999 and the New South Wales Biodiversity Conservation Act 2016. The main threat to its survival is habitat disturbance and degradation due to recreational activities.

References

evansiana
Flora of New South Wales
Proteales of Australia
Endemic flora of Australia
Taxa named by Hugh Shaw MacKee
Plants described in 1953